"Stainsby Girls" is a song by British singer-songwriter Chris Rea, released in 1985 as the lead single from his seventh studio album Shamrock Diaries. It was written by Rea, and produced by Rea and Dave Richards. "Stainsby Girls" reached No. 26 in the UK and remained in the charts for twelve weeks.

"Stainsby Girls" was written by Rea as a tribute for his wife Joan, a former student of the Stainsby Secondary Modern School. The single's B-side, "And When She Smiles", is listed on the back sleeve as having been "recorded on eight track on a yacht in Ibiza harbour". Rea later re-recorded "Stainsby Girls" for his 1988 album New Light Through Old Windows.

Critical reception
In a retrospective review of Shamrock Diaries, Sharon Mawer of AllMusic described the song as "easily the most like Bruce Springsteen that Rea had ever sounded". Colin Larkin, in his book The Encyclopedia of Popular Music, noted the song was a "slice of nostalgia for the northern England of Rea's adolescence".

Track listing
7" single
 "Stainsby Girls" – 3:50
 "And When She Smiles" – 3:12

12" single (German release)
 "Stainsby Girls (Sax-Mix)" – 4:20
 "September Blue" – 3:54

Chart performance

Personnel
 Chris Rea - vocals, guitar, producer
 Eoghan O'Neill - bass
 Mel Collins - saxophone
 Dave Mattacks - drums
 Dave Richards - producer, engineer
 Barry Hammond - engineer

References

1985 songs
1985 singles
Magnet Records singles
Songs written by Chris Rea
Chris Rea songs